Abala Abaya is a woreda in Wolaita Zone of Southern Nations, Nationalities, and Peoples' Region, Ethiopia. The woreda is established in 2019 from the surrounding woredas. And those surrounding woredas formed border to the Abala Abaya woreda.  Abala Abaya is bordered on the south by Lake Abaya, on the west by the Offa woreda, on the north by the Humbo woreda, on the east  by Hobicha woreda.  The administrative center of this woreda is Faracho Town.

Notes 

Wolayita
Districts of the Southern Nations, Nationalities, and Peoples' Region